Lazna is a small dispersed settlement in western Slovenia in the Municipality of Nova Gorica. It is located on the Trnovo Forest Plateau above the Vipava Valley and is only accessible by road from the village of Lokve.

References

External links
Lazna on Geopedia

Populated places in the City Municipality of Nova Gorica